Fonte Boa may refer to:
 Fonte Boa, Amazonas, Brazil
 Fonte Boa (parish), Esposende Municipality, Portugal
 Fonte Boa e Rio Tinto, Portugal